The men's doubles of the 2013 Prague Open by Advantage Cars tournament was played on clay in Prague, Czech Republic.
Lukáš Rosol and Horacio Zeballos were the defending champions, but both decided not to participate.
Lee Hsin-han and Peng Hsien-yin defeated Vahid Mirzadeh and Denis Zivkovic 6–4, 4–6, [10–5] in the final to win the title.

Seeds

Draw

Draw

External Links
 Main Draw

Prague Open - Doubles
2013 - Doubles